, also known as A Filmful Life, is a 2006 documentary directed by Japanese director Shunji Iwai about the life of iconic and prolific Japanese director Kon Ichikawa. The documentary also devotes time to Natto Wada, Ichikawa's wife, who wrote many of his screenplays.

It was filmed during production of Ichikawa's 2006 film , a remake of his 1976 film of the same name, which would prove to be the director's final film.

A DVD (with English subtitles) was released in Japan on June 29, 2007. Ichikawa died the following year at the age of 92.

External links 
 

2006 films
2000s Japanese-language films
Films directed by Shunji Iwai
2000s Japanese films